Ravenloft is a campaign setting for the Dungeons & Dragons role-playing game.

Ravenloft may refer to:

Ravenloft (module), a 1983 adventure module for the Dungeons & Dragons role-playing game
Ravenloft II: The House on Gryphon Hill, 1986 sequel to the original Ravenloft module
Ravenloft: Realm of Terror, a boxed set accessory published in 1990 for the Ravenloft campaign setting for the Advanced Dungeons & Dragons fantasy role-playing game
Ravenloft: Strahd's Possession, a 1994 fantasy role-playing video game developed by DreamForge Intertainment for Strategic Simulations, Inc. for DOS
Ravenloft: Stone Prophet, a 1995 fantasy role-playing video game and the sequel to Ravenloft: Strahd's Possession

See also
Castle Ravenloft (disambiguation)